The 1810 Census revealed dramatic population growth in Ohio since 1800, resulting in its representation increasing from a single Representative to six, resulting in the State being broken up into 6 districts, abolishing the .  Jeremiah Morrow (Democratic-Republican), who had served since Ohio achieved statehood in 1803, retired to run for U.S. Senator, so that all six seats were open. Its elections were held October 13, 1812.

See also 
 Ohio's 3rd congressional district special election, 1813
 Ohio's 6th congressional district special election, 1813
 United States House of Representatives elections, 1812 and 1813
 List of United States representatives from Ohio

Notes 

1812
Ohio
United States House of Representatives